The battle of Konary took place during the Great War, in May and June 1915 in the Sandomierz Uplands, near the village of Konary and the town of Klimontów, Poland, between the Russian Army and the forces of Józef Piłsudski's Polish Legions. The battle started on 16 May, when the Russian 4th Army started its counter-offensive against the Central Powers in the Kingdom of Poland. The offensive was directed against the wing of the Austrian 25th Infantry Division in the area of Opatów and Klimontów. The Polish 1st Brigade was used as a stop-gap measure and held out until 23 June, when the Russian offensive was finally repelled. Both sides suffered heavy losses.

Conflicts in 1915
Battles of the Eastern Front (World War I)
Battles of World War I involving Poland
Battles of World War I involving Russia
Polish Legions in World War I
Radom Governorate
1915 in the Russian Empire
May 1915 events
June 1915 events